In number theory, the Davenport–Erdős theorem states that, for sets of multiples of integers, several different notions of density are equivalent.

Let  be a sequence of positive integers.

According to the Davenport–Erdős theorem, for a set , the following notions of density are equivalent, in the sense that they all produce the same number as each other for the density of :
As these sets can be decomposed into finitely many disjoint arithmetic progressions, their densities are well defined without resort to limits.
However, there exist sequences  and their sets of multiples  for which the upper natural density (taken using the superior limit in place of the inferior limit) differs from the lower density, and for which the natural density itself (the limit of the same sequence of values) does not exist.

The theorem is named after Harold Davenport and Paul Erdős, who published it in 1936. Their original proof used the Hardy–Littlewood tauberian theorem; later, they published another, elementary proof.

See also
Behrend sequence, a sequence  for which the density  described by this theorem is one

References

Theorems in number theory